SARS eFiling is the official online tax returns submission portal for the South African Revenue Service launched originally under a different name and business model in 2000 by private sector companies. These private sector companies charged an average fee of R46 per transaction for this service. This chargeable business model failed as taxpayers were loath to pay to submit their tax returns but the technology had proven itself and in September 2003 Taxbreak, the predominant online tax service, was rebranded and launched by the South African Minister of Finance as a free SARS service. SARS contracted a private company, Interfile (https://interfile.co.za/), to enhance and operate SARSeFiling until 2010 when SARS took the initiative in house. In the 2015/2016 tax year SARS eFiling processed 36.80 million electronic submissions and payments which equates to 98.7% of all submissions and payments to SARS in South Africa.

SARS eFiling provides free services to individual taxpayers, trusts, companies and tax practitioners to submit tax returns, submit declarations and make relevant payments in an online environment.

The eFiling service is of an international standard and is comparable to online tax submission services offered in the United States, Australia, Singapore, Ireland, Chile and France.

Services

See also 
 National Budget of South Africa
 SARS

References

External links 

Taxation in South Africa
Revenue services
South African websites